Riccardo Raffaele (born in L'Aquila on 18 July 1996) is an Italian rugby union player.
His usual position is as a Scrum-Half and he currently plays for Colorno in Top12.

In 2017–18 Pro14 and 2018–19 Pro14 seasons, he played for Zebre in Pro 14. From 2019 to 2022 he played for Colorno in Top12.

In 2015 and 2016 Raffaele was named in the Italy Under 20 squad.

References

External links 
It's Rugby England Profile
Ultimate Rugby Profile
Eurosport Profile

Sportspeople from the Province of L'Aquila
Italian rugby union players
1996 births
Living people
Rugby Colorno players
Rugby union scrum-halves
People from L'Aquila
Rugby Calvisano players
Zebre Parma players